Louise Shurtleff Brown Verrill (23 March 187017 February 1948) was an American composer and pianist.

Verrill was born in Portland, Maine to Lewis F. and Mary Alice Abbott Brown. She studied piano and composition in Berlin and Dresden, then married Harry Mighels Verrill in 1895. They had five children.

Verrill's music was published by Louis H. Ross & Co. Her works include:

Piano 

Alone

Birch Tree

Chaconne

Du bist wie eine Blume

Exultation

Four Moods of a Gnome

Ghosts on Parade

It Happened in Spain

It is Spring

Jennie Kissed Me

Lonely Pine

March of the Patriot

Reverie

Rumpelstiltskin

Slumber Song 

Tenderness

Tone Pictures

Tone Poem

Walhalla

Waltz

When Shadows Fall

Yellow Moon

Vocal 

"Pleasant Dreams"

Winter Joy (solo and chorus)

"You Came Like the Dawn" (music by Ivan McScod; text by Louise Brown Verrill)

External links 
Download free sheet music by Louise Brown Verrill

References 

American composers
American women composers
1870 births
1948 deaths